Truro (Mi'kmaq: Wagobagitik; Scottish Gaelic: Truru) is a town in central Nova Scotia, Canada. Truro is the shire town of Colchester County and is located on the south side of the Salmon River floodplain, close to the river's mouth at the eastern end of Cobequid Bay.

History

The area has been home to the Mi'kmaq people for several centuries. The Mi'kmaq name for the Truro area, "Wagobagitik" means "end of the water's flow". Mi'kmaq people continue to live in the area at the Millbrook and Truro reserves of the Millbrook – We’kopekwitk band.

Acadian settlers came to this area in the early 1700s. The Mi'kmaq name for the Truro area was shortened by the settlers to "Cobequid", and the bay to the west of the town is still named Cobequid Bay. By 1727, the settlers had established a small village near the present downtown site of Truro known as "Vil Bois Brule" (Village in the burnt wood). Many Acadians in this region left in the Acadian Exodus which preceded the Expulsion of the Acadians in 1755. In 1761, the British settled the area with Presbyterians of predominantly Ulster Scottish origin who came from Ireland via New England. They named the new settlement after the city of Truro in Cornwall, United Kingdom.

Originally a small farming community, the construction of the Nova Scotia Railway between Halifax, and Pictou in 1858 caused the municipality to experience a fast rate of growth which increased even more when the railway connected to central Canada in 1872 and became the Intercolonial Railway. The Intercolonial, which later became the Canadian National Railway built a large roundhouse and rail yard in Truro. Further rail links to Cape Breton and to the Annapolis Valley through the Dominion Atlantic Railway in 1905 increased the town's importance as a transportation hub for Nova Scotia. The railway also attracted industries such as the Truro Woolen Mills in 1870 (which later became Stanfield's) and provincial institutions like the provincial Normal School (later the Nova Scotia Teachers College) and the Nova Scotia Agricultural College.  The town officially incorporated in 1875. Many figures from the town's past were featured in over 40 tree sculptures which were carved in tree trunks after Truro lost most of its Elm trees to Dutch Elm Disease in the 1990s.  As of 2018, most of these sculptures were suffering from severe deterioration and were taken down. The history of the town and surrounding county is preserved at the Colchester Historical Museum (c.1900-1901), which is designated under the provincial Heritage Property Act.

Black history

Three areas of Truro contain predominately African Nova Scotian residents. The residents of Upper/Lower Ford Street (“the Marsh”) are descendants of Black Loyalists and Black Refugees. Young Street (“the Hill”) has people from a number of different cultural and ethnic diversities. Black Loyalist descendants make up the vast majority of people in the third area, West Prince Street (“the Island”). Many of Truro's black community has roots in the historically important Black Nova Scotian settlements of Guysborough County. Zion United Baptist Church, first founded in 1896 on Prince Street, has long been the spiritual heart of the community.

Truro is also the birthplace of world-renowned contralto, Portia White (1911–1968). To support herself while taking music lessons at the Maritime Conservatory of Performing Arts she taught school in Africville and Lucasville. Her national debut occurred in 1941 at the Eaton Auditorium in Toronto, and her international debut came at the Town Hall in New York in 1944. She gave a Command Performance for Queen Elizabeth II at the opening of Confederation Centre in Charlottetown in 1964. A monument commemorating Portia White stands on the grounds of the Zion United Baptist Church.

A number of other prominent Black Canadians have roots in the town. One of Canada's most well known civil rights leader, Burnley Allan "Rocky" Jones, was raised in "the Marsh" neighbourhood of Truro. Art Dorrington, the first black hockey player to sign an NHL contract was raised in "the Island".

Infrastructure and attractions 

Truro is known as the Hub of Nova Scotia as it is located at the junction between the Canadian National Railway, running between Halifax and Montreal, and the Cape Breton and Central Nova Scotia Railway, running between Truro and Port Hawkesbury. Until the 1980s, Truro also hosted a junction between the Canadian National and Canadian Pacific Railway's former Dominion Atlantic Railway line running through Windsor and down the Annapolis Valley to Yarmouth, Nova Scotia.

An important highway interchange is located just north of Truro in the rural community of Onslow where Highway 102 ends at Highway 104 - both four lane expressways.  Secondary roads Trunk 2 and Trunk 4 intersect in the town.  Important tertiary roads Route 236 and Route 311 end in the nearby communities of Lower Truro and Onslow respectively. Some of these roads also form part of the Glooscap Trail which is a scenic drive for tourists. Truro railway station is served by Via Rail's Ocean line.

Nova Scotia Power has several transmission line corridors in or near Truro; additionally Bell Aliant, EastLink and 360networks route most of the major telephone and data communications lines in the province through the town.

Six large sections of the Berlin Wall are located along the Cobequid Trail, on the Agricultural Campus of Dalhousie University.

Education
Truro has two public high schools, Cobequid Educational Centre and the francophone École acadienne de Truro.  Post-secondary options include a campus of the Nova Scotia Community College, and The Institute of Human Services Education, Jane Norman College as well as the Agricultural Campus of Dalhousie University, in the neighboring village of Bible Hill.

Sports 
Truro has three ice hockey rinks: Deuvilles Rink, Rath Eastlink Community Centre, and the Colchester Legion Stadium. Truro is home to the Truro Bearcats, a Junior "A" ice hockey team who are four time MJAHL Champions. (Canadian) Football is also a popular sport in the town with all games being played on Friday night at the Truro Amateur Athletic Club (TAAC) grounds. Truro Raceway conducts harness races every Sunday. Truro is also home to a rugby club, which hosts the World Indoor Sevens Rugby Championships.

Truro also has a senior baseball team, the Truro Senior Bearcats, that play in the Nova Scotia Senior Baseball League. Their home field is at the Truro Amateur Athletic Club (TAAC).

Lacrosse has become a very popular sport in Truro over the recent years. There is a minor lacrosse association, the Truro Bearcats Lacrosse Association, which allows youth to take part in organized lacrosse teams and games. As well, there is a junior A lacrosse team, the Mi'Kmaq Warriors, that plays in the East Coast Junior Lacrosse League. They play in the summer months out of the Colchester Legion Stadium.

Truro enjoys a vibrant soccer scene centered about the local "CC Riders" soccer club which serves "Tier 2" soccer for both genders and all ages. Outdoor soccer takes place between May and October and indoor 7-a-side and pickup games run through the winter months.

Finally, there is also curling, bowling, swimming, softball, baseball, tennis, golfing, martial arts, snowboarding, snowshoeing, basketball, volleyball, skiing and most everything else either at school and/or local club level.

Notable people

 Sir Adams George Archibald, Father of Confederation
 Nora Bernard, Mi'kmaq activist 
 Cory Bowles, actor/dancer/musician
 Jenny Brine, retired CWHL ice hockey player 
 Matt Brouwer, gospel singer guitarist
 Lyle Carter, retired National Hockey League goaltender (originally from Brookfield)
 Bob Champoux, retired National Hockey League goaltender
 Jocelyne Couture-Nowak, French language instructor who established the École acadienne de Truro, but was shot and killed in the 2007 Virginia Tech massacre
 Glenn V. Davidson, Retired Naval Officer. Recipient of an Honorary Doctorate of Civil Laws from University Kings College.
Martin Henry Dawson, led pioneering research into DNA and penicillin, found the cure for Subacute Bacterial Endocarditis
 Fred Dickson, Harper appointed member of the Senate of Canada (originally from Glace Bay)
 Art Dorrington, first Black hockey player to sign an NHL contract
 Jeff Douglas, actor (Joe of I Am Canadian) and broadcast presenter
 John Gray, playwright
 Harry Hampton, Scottish-American golf professional
 A. J. B. Johnston, historian and novelist
 Burnley "Rocky" Jones, political activist
 Jeremiah "Jerry" Jones, soldier
 Chet Koneczny, professional lacrosse player
 Brett Lauther, CFL player
 Mary Florence MacDonald, curator
 Lewis MacKenzie, retired Major-General
 Sandy MacKenzie, professional (ice) hockey player
 Greg Maddison, deputy Chief of the Defence Staff
 Jon McIsaac, professional (ice) hockey referee
 Leo McKay Jr., Novelist
 Justin Palardy, professional Canadian football player
 Doug Rogers, Olympian and flag bearer for Canada at the 1972 Olympics.
 Melissa Ann Shepard, Criminal
 Zach Sill, professional (ice) hockey player
 George Isaac Smith, 18th Premier of Nova Scotia (1967-1970); Trudeau appointed member of the Senate of Canada (originally from Stewiacke, Nova Scotia)
 Barry Stagg, singer-songwriter/playwright/musician
 Robert Stanfield, politician
 Bill White, composer/politician/social activist
 Jack White, labour union activist / politician
 Johan Edlund, vocalist and guitarist of Tiamat (band)
 Portia White, singer
 William A. White, church minister and father to Bill, Jack and Portia
 Lenore Zann, actress and politician
 Joey Mullen, "The king of DIY" fishkeeping YouTuber

Climate

Truro has a humid continental climate (Köppen climate classification Dfb) similar to the vast majority of The Maritimes with warm, wet summers and cold, snowy winters.

Demographics 

See also 
 List of municipalities in Nova Scotia
 Central Nova Tourist Association — Tourism association representing Cumberland County and Colchester County, including Truro.

Notes

References

External links 

 Town of Truro (official website)

Towns in Nova Scotia